Filippo Palazzino (born 30 September 2003) is an Italian football player. He plays for Ascoli.

Club career
He made his Serie B debut for Ascoli on 14 January 2022 in a game against Ternana.

References

External links
 

2003 births
Living people
Italian footballers
Association football forwards
Ascoli Calcio 1898 F.C. players
Serie B players
21st-century Italian people